Dela (also Romanized as Delā) is a village in Pian Rural District, in the Central District of Izeh County, Khuzestan Province, Iran. At the 2006 census, its population was 165, in 31 families.

References 

Populated places in Izeh County